Derek James Clayton (born 17 November 1942) is a former Australian long-distance runner, born in Cumbria, England and raised in Northern Ireland.

Clayton set a marathon world best in the Fukuoka Marathon, Japan on 3 December 1967 in 2:09:36.4, in what is considered a classic race, the first marathon race ever run in less than two hours and ten minutes.

He went on to break this time at the Antwerp Marathon on 30 May 1969 by more than a minute; this time stood as the world best for nearly another 12 years. His personal best time of 2:08:33.6 is still a world-class marathon time. Clayton represented Australia at the 1968 Summer Olympics in Mexico City, finishing in 7th place (2:27:23). Four years later he finished in 13th place (2:19:49) in the same event.

At the 1971 Australian Athletics Championships, he won the marathon in 2:11:08.8. Two years later, he won the Australian Athletics Championships marathon again in 2:12:07.6.

Clayton was inducted into the Sport Australia Hall of Fame in 1999.

Notes

References

External links
 
 
 
 
 
 
 A history of the Fukuoka International Marathon Championships
 Athletes of the marathon

1942 births
Living people
Sportspeople from Cumbria
Australian male long-distance runners
Australian male marathon runners
Male marathon runners from Northern Ireland
Male long-distance runners from Northern Ireland
British male marathon runners
British male long-distance runners
Olympic male marathon runners
Olympic athletes of Australia
Athletes (track and field) at the 1968 Summer Olympics
Athletes (track and field) at the 1972 Summer Olympics
Commonwealth Games competitors for Australia
Athletes (track and field) at the 1970 British Commonwealth Games
Athletes (track and field) at the 1974 British Commonwealth Games
World record setters in athletics (track and field)
Japan Championships in Athletics winners
Australian Athletics Championships winners
Sport Australia Hall of Fame inductees